Assiniboine Community College (ACC) is a Canadian community college in the province of Manitoba. It is accredited by the Manitoba Council on Post-Secondary Education, which was created by the government of Manitoba.

The Victoria Avenue East and the North Hill campuses are located in Brandon. The Parkland Campus, a satellite campus, is located in Dauphin, and training sites are located in Winnipeg, Russell, Neepawa, Russell, Swan River, and Steinbach.

History
Assiniboine Community College first opened in 1961 as the Brandon Vocational Training Centre. When the school first opened, it consisted of four staff members and offered two courses to 24 students. By 1966, the school had grown to a staff of 24 and offered 11 programs to 300 students.

Programs
ACC offers diploma, certificate,  apprenticeship, and continuing education programs. The college's educational delivery is offered through a variety of approaches, including face-to-face, distance and online, integrated programs and blended learning.

ACC offers over 50 programs in the fields of agriculture, environment, business, health and human services and trades and technology. The enabling legislation for the college is the Colleges Act.

The college's largest program is the practical nursing diploma. In 2007, the practical nursing program was offered in Brandon, Winnipeg, and two rural Manitoba communities. In 2022, additional rural rotating practical nursing sites were added in Otterburne and Morden. In response to the COVID-19 pandemic, the provincial government invested in 55 additional licensed practical nursing seats through ACC in Portage la Prairie and rural rotating sites.

Campus

ACC has three campuses in Brandon, Manitoba. Currently, two-thirds of the college's students body in Brandon study at the Victoria Avenue East Campus, located at 1430 Victoria Avenue East. The college also runs an Adult Collegiate located in downtown Brandon, which came into operation in the fall of 1995 and offers adult upgrading for various senior high school courses. The college's North Hill Campus in Brandon is the location of the former Brandon Mental Health Centre. This location is home to the Manitoba Institute of Culinary Arts, the Len Evans Centre for Trades and Technology and the college's Sustainable Greenhouse.

ACC's Parkland Campus is located in Dauphin and offers several full-time day programs and a range of evening and off-campus courses. ACC's Winnipeg Campus is located in Winnipeg, Manitoba and offers the Practical Nursing program and continuing studies courses. The college's Russell Training Centre is located in Russell, Manitoba and offers continuing studies and contract programs and courses.

Notable alumni and faculty

faculty 
Stephen Downes, philosopher

Scholarships
Assiniboine Community College joined Project Hero, a scholarship program cofounded by General (Ret'd) Rick Hillier for the families of fallen Canadian Forces members.

See also
List of agricultural universities and colleges
List of universities in Manitoba
Higher education in Manitoba
Education in Canada

References

External links
Official Website

Universities and colleges in Manitoba
Education in Brandon, Manitoba
Educational institutions established in 1861
1861 establishments in the British Empire